Jaworski (feminine: Jaworska, plural: Jaworscy) is a surname of Polish-language origin. It is related to a number of surnames in other languages.

Related surnames

People

Jaworski/Jaworska
 Beata Jaworska (born 1994), Polish basketball player
 Chet Jaworski (1916–2003), American basketball player
 Daniela Jaworska (born 1946), Polish athlete
 Jakub Jaworski (born 1986), Polish speed skater
 Leon Jaworski (1905–1982), American attorney
 Marian Jaworski (born 1926), Polish cardinal
 Matt Jaworski (born 1967), American football player
 Mikee Cojuangco-Jaworski (born 1974) Filipino equestrian
 Paul Jaworski (1900–1929), American gangster
 Rafał Jaworski (born 1973), Polish historian
Renata Jaworska (born 1979), Polish artist
 Robert Jaworski (born 1946), Filipino basketball player and politician
 Robert Jaworski Jr. (born 1972), Filipino basketball player
 Ron Jaworski (born 1951), American football player
 Jean-Philippe Jaworski (born 1969), French fantasy writer
 Tadeusz Jaworski (born 1945), Polish runner
 Walery Jaworski (1849–1924), Polish gastroenterologist

Related surnames
 Boleslav Yavorsky (1877–1942), Russian musicologist
 Constantin Iavorschi (born 1990), Moldovan football player
 Jiří Javorský (1932–2002), Czech tennis player
 Nikolai Yavorsky (1891–1947), Cuban choreographer
 Serhiy Yavorskyi (born 1989), Ukrainian football player
 Stefan Yavorsky (1658–1722), archbishop and statesman in the Russian Empire
 Taras Yavorskyi (born 1989), Ukrainian football player
 Vadym Yavorskyi (born 1994), Ukrainian football player
 Vladimír Javorský (born 1962), Czech actor

See also
 
 
 
 

Polish-language surnames